Talash is a 1969 Hindi drama film directed by O. P. Ralhan starring Rajendra Kumar and Sharmila Tagore in lead roles. This was the first Indian movie which was publicised as having a budget of Rs 1 Crore (i.e. INR 10 Millions).

Plot
Raj Kumar (Rajendra Kumar) dreams of a life of prosperity. When he learns that his mother (Sulochana Latkar) has struggled for years to give him the best, he takes a job at Ranjit Rai (Balraj Sahni)'s company. His hard work pays off and he is able to earn the trust of his boss and get promoted to a good post. On a vacation with his friend Lachchu (O. P. Ralhan), he falls in love with the village beauty Gauri (Sharmila Tagore) and promises her father (D.K. Sapru) that he will return in a month's time to marry her. But things get complicated when he returns to the city and Raj's boss wants Raj to marry his daughter or perhaps lose his job. After many twists and turns, the lovers are reunited and all's well that ends well.

Cast

 Rajendra Kumar as Raj Kumar 'Raju'
 Sharmila Tagore as Madhu / Gauri
 O. P. Ralhan as Lachchu
 Balraj Sahni as Ranjit Rai
 Helen as Rita
 Sulochana Latkar as Raj Kumar's Mother (as Sulochana)
 Sajjan as Dice / Albert (Rita's Father)
 Jeevan as John
 Hari Shivdasani as Babulal (Lachchu's Father)
 Madan Puri as Peter	
 D.K. Sapru as Gauri's Father (as Sapru)
 Tun Tun as Kamini
  Randhir hotel manager

Soundtrack
The album of this film was composed by S. D. Burman and penned by Majrooh Sultanpuri. This album has various kinds of hits starting from the very romantic 'Palkon Ke Peechhe Se' to the sentimental 'Meri Duniya Hai Maa Tere Aanchal Mein'. It even covers the Indian Classical based number 'Tere Naina Talash Karen' to the sensational cabaret dance by Helen called 'Kar Le Pyar'.

The song "Aaj Ko Junli Raat Maa" samples the Romance theme from the Lieutenant Kijé Suite by Russian composer Sergei Prokofiev.

References

External links
 

1960s Hindi-language films
1969 films
Indian crime thriller films
1960s crime thriller films
Films scored by S. D. Burman